Eastern High School (EHS) is a public high school in Reedsville, Ohio, United States.  It is the only high school in the Eastern Local School District.  Their nickname is the Eagles.

Athletics
The Eagles belong to the Ohio High School Athletic Association (OHSAA) and the Tri-Valley Conference|, a 16-member athletic conference located in southeastern Ohio. The conference is divided into two divisions based on school size. The Ohio Division features the larger schools and the Hocking Division features the smaller schools, including Eastern.

History
Eastern High School was formed through the consolidation of Olive-Orange High School in Tuppers Plains, Chester High School, and Riverview High School in Reedsville in 1958. Both the old high schools served as K-8th buildings in their respective communities until the construction of the new Eastern Elementary and Middle School was completed next door to the high school in 1999. The old Riverview School and its surrounding property were purchased by Shelly and Sands, Inc shortly there after and was demolished, much to the disapproval of community members in the Reedsville-Long Bottom area. The old Chester school serves as a community center. The Olive-Orange building is still operational in Tuppers Plains, housing both a preschool and the administrative offices of Eastern Local School District.

OHSAA state championships
 (State Champions) Girls' Basketball- 2014
 (State Semi Finalists) Girls' Basketball- 2013
 (State Semi Finalists) Boys' Basketball- 2001
 (State Semi Finalists) Softball- 2001

See also
 Ohio high school athletic conferences

References

External links
 District Website
 OHSAA Member School Information Page

High schools in Meigs County, Ohio
Public high schools in Ohio
Public middle schools in Ohio